Amos Masaba Wekesa, is a businessman, entrepreneur and corporate executive in Uganda, who is the founder, proprietor and managing director of Great Lakes Safaris Limited, a tour operating company, in the African Great Lakes region. His conglomerate of related tour businesses grosses an estimated US$8 million annually, and employs in excess of 250 people.

Background and education
Wekesa was born on 22 April 1973, in Lwakhakha, Uganda, a border town at the international border with Kenya. His family was of very modest means.

When he was ten years old, missionaries from the Salvation Army came and offered him sponsorship to elementary school. He transferred to the town of Tororo, where he completed his elementary school, under sponsorship from the Salvation Army.

He went on to complete his O-Level education at Wairaka College, in Wairaka, Jinja District. He then transferred to St. Peter's College Tororo, where he completed his A-Level studies. He then studied at a tourism school in Kampala, Uganda's capital city, graduating with a Certificate in Tourism, nine months later.

Career
From 1997 until 2001, he worked in four different tour operating companies as a lowly-paid office employee. In 2001, with US$200 in savings, without a motor vehicle and with his office underneath a staircase, in Kampala, Amos Wekesa founded Great Lakes Safaris Limited. His other investments include Uganda Lodges Limited, a collection of four unique eco-friendly safari facilities: (a) Simba Safari Camp Limited in Queen Elizabeth National Park (QENP) (b) Elephant Plains Limited in QENP (c) Primate Lodge Limited in Kibaale National Park and (d) Budongo Eco Lodge Limited in Murchison Falls National Park.

Family
Amos Wekesa is married to Susan Amy Wekesa and together are the parents of three children, two sons and one daughter.

Other considerations
He sits on a number of corporate boards, including as a member of the board of directors of the Uganda Tourism Board. He is a former president of the Uganda Tourism Association and the current chairman of the Tourism Technical Working Group of the Presidential Investment Round Table.

In 2019, Wekesa plans to take up motivational speaking as a paying engagement. He also plans to build a hotel in the city of Entebbe, in the next four years.

See also
 Lilly Ajarova
 Tourism in Uganda
 List of protected areas of Uganda

References

External links
 From Poverty To CEO: Ugandan Founder Of ‘Great Lakes Safaris’ Looks Back On 20 Years Of Success As of 23 April 2021.

Living people
1973 births
Ugandan businesspeople
Ugandan chief executives
Ugandan business executives
People from Namisindwa District
People from Eastern Region, Uganda